Robert Dienst (1 March 1928 – 13 June 2000) was an Austrian football forward. He died in 2000 after a long illness.

Club career
Robert Dienst started his career at Floridsdorfer AC, where he played his first game as a midfielder during World War II.  He turned into a prolific striker at Rapid Wien and became one of the most successful Austrian goalscorers in the 1950s, three times topping the top goalscorers charts and winning six league titles. With his 307 Bundesliga goals, he is still Rapid's record league goalscorer.

He scored 323 goals in 351 games in total in the Austrian Football Bundesliga.

International career
He made his debut for Austria in an October 1949 match against Hungary and earned a total of 27 caps, scoring 12 goals. He was a participant at the 1954 FIFA World Cup and 1958 FIFA World Cup.

Honours
Austrian Football Bundesliga (6):
 1951, 1952, 1954, 1956, 1957, 1960
Austrian Cup (1):
 1961
Zentropa Cup (1):
 1951
Austrian Bundesliga Top Goalscorer (4):
 1951, 1953, 1954, 1957

References

External links
 Player profile and stats - Rapidarchiv 
 Weltfussball  
 

1928 births
2000 deaths
Austrian footballers
Austria international footballers
1954 FIFA World Cup players
1958 FIFA World Cup players
SK Rapid Wien players
Austrian Football Bundesliga players
Austrian football managers
FK Austria Wien managers
Association football forwards
Footballers from Vienna
Floridsdorfer AC players